7 Wishes is the third studio album by the American hard rock band Night Ranger, released in 1985 and produced by Pat Glasser. The album features three Billboard Hot 100 chart hits: "Sentimental Street" reached No. 8, "Four in the Morning" No. 19 and "Goodbye"  No. 17.

The title of "Four in the Morning (I Can't Take Anymore)" describes the time of day Jack Blades wrote the song. In an interview with the Songfacts website, he explained, "Literally, I wrote that song at 4 in the morning. I mean, I woke up, and I had an idea, (singing) 'I can't take anymore, I can't fake anymore, it's such a hard time loving you.'"

Track listing

Personnel
Night Ranger
Jack Blades – bass, lead vocals
Jeff Watson – lead and rhythm guitars
Brad Gillis – lead and rhythm guitars
Alan Fitzgerald – keyboards, synthesizers, piano, vocals
Kelly Keagy – drums, percussion, lead vocals

Additional musicians
Vince Neil, Tommy Lee, Kevin Charles, David Sykes, Fishdog – backing vocals on "Night Machine"

Production
Pat Glasser – producer
John Van Nest – engineer, associate producer
Duane Aslaksen, Steve Krause, David Luke – assistant engineers
Brian Gardner – mastering

Charts

Album

Singles

Certifications

References

Night Ranger albums
1985 albums
MCA Records albums